Wii is a series of simulation games published by Nintendo for the game console of the same name, as well as its successor, the Wii U. After a seven-year hiatus, the game Nintendo Switch Sports, described officially as "a new iteration of the Wii Sports series," was announced, the first game to drop the "Wii" from its title. These games feature a common design theme, with recurring elements including casual-oriented gameplay, casts consisting mostly or entirely of Miis, and control schemes that simulate real-life activities.

The Wii series was conceived by Nintendo executive Shigeru Miyamoto to package and sell similar Wii Remote prototype games in a single package.

Gameplay 
The Wii uses motion sensors in its Wii Remote to allow gameplay that incorporates physical movements by the player to control action within the game. For example, in the Baseball game included in Wii Sports, the player holds the controller like a baseball bat and swings it in order to hit the ball in the game. However, in Wii Chess, on the menus and in actual gameplay, the control scheme makes use of the D-pad on the Wii Remote instead of the Wii Remote Pointer.

Games 
Wii has become one of the best-selling video game franchises, with each Wii game selling millions of copies. Wii Sports in particular is regarded as the fourth best-selling video game of all time, as well as the best-selling single console game of all time. By June 2009, Wii Fit had helped the health game genre to generate collective revenues of $2 billion, most of which was grossed by the game'''s 18.22 million sales at the time. The largest subset of the franchise is Wii Sports''.

Wii Sports

Wii Play

Wii Fit

Wii Party

Other titles

Software

References

Wii games
Wii U games
Nintendo franchises
Video game franchises
Video game franchises introduced in 2006